Gonzalo Pérez Iribarren (1936–1998) was an Uruguayan mathematician and statistical expert.

20th-century Uruguayan mathematicians
1936 births
1998 deaths